East Branch is an unincorporated community located at the confluence of the East Branch of Little Sandy Creek with the main stream in Oliver Township, Jefferson County, Pennsylvania, United States.

References

Unincorporated communities in Jefferson County, Pennsylvania
Unincorporated communities in Pennsylvania